The Zanzibar red bishop (Euplectes nigroventris) is a species of bird in the family Ploceidae.
It is found in Kenya, Mozambique, and Tanzania.

References

External links
Zanzibar bishop on Weaver Watch

Zanzibar red bishop
Birds of East Africa
Zanzibar
Zanzibar red bishop
Taxonomy articles created by Polbot